Ruskovce may refer to:

Ruskovce, Bánovce nad Bebravou District, Slovakia
Ruskovce, Sobrance District, Slovakia